Melah Bid (also Romanized as Melah Bīd and Melahbīd) is a village in Horr Rural District, Dinavar District, Sahneh County, Kermanshah Province, Iran. At the 2006 census, its population was 104, in 30 families.

References 

Populated places in Sahneh County